Keith John Walley (born 19 October 1954 in Weymouth, Dorset) is an English former professional footballer who played as a midfielder in the Football League, American Soccer League, North American Soccer League, and Major Indoor Soccer League.

References

1954 births
Living people
English footballers
English expatriate footballers
Association football midfielders
Sportspeople from Weymouth
Footballers from Dorset
Crystal Palace F.C. players
Weymouth F.C. players
Chelmsford City F.C. players
California Surf players
English Football League players
North American Soccer League (1968–1984) players
Expatriate soccer players in the United States
English expatriate sportspeople in the United States